"It Overtakes Me" (extended title: "It Overtakes Me / The Stars Are So Big... I Am So Small... Do I Stand a Chance?") is a song by The Flaming Lips, and the title track of a four-track EP of the same name, released on November 13, 2006.

The EP contains a shorter version of the song featured on At War with the Mystics, with the "Stars Are So Big..." segment omitted. Also, "It Overtakes Me" received some exposure in the United Kingdom due to its inclusion in a television commercial for Beck's in mid-2006.

Track listing

Charts

References

2006 EPs
The Flaming Lips EPs
Warner Records EPs